Karaye is a Local Government Area and Headquarter of Karaye Emirate Council in Kano State, Nigeria. Its headquarters are in the town of Karaye.

It has an area of 479 km and a population of 141,407 at the 2006 census.
It accommodates the National Youth Service Corps (NYSC) orientation camp in Kano State.

Karaye is the home of Challawa Gorge Dam. It is a major reservoir on the Challawa River, a tributary of the Kano River, which is the main tributary of the Hadejia River.

The postal code of the area is 704.

References

Local Government Areas in Kano State